2012 in professional wrestling describes the year's events in the world of professional wrestling.

List of notable promotions 
These promotions held notable shows in 2012.

Calendar of notable shows

January

February

March

April

May

June

July

August

September

October

November

December

Accomplishments and tournaments

AAA

Ring of Honor

Total Nonstop Action Wrestling

WWE

Title changes

AAA

NJPW

ROH

TNA

WWE

NXT

Awards and honors

AAA Hall of Fame

Pro Wrestling Illustrated

TNA Hall of Fame

Wrestling Observer Newsletter

Wrestling Observer Newsletter Hall of Fame

Wrestling Observer Newsletter awards

WWE

WWE Hall of Fame

Slammy Awards

Debuts

 unknown date – Moose
 April 1 – Will Ospreay
 April 13 – Hideyoshi Kamitani
 July 11 – Drew Parker
 July 28 – Yoshihisa Uto
 August 12 – Rydeen Hagane
 October 14 – Tank Nagai
 October 18 – Baron Corbin
 October 25
 Charlotte Flair
 Enzo Amore
 November 15 – Sho Tanaka
 November 19 – Yohei Komatsu
 November 23 – Sagat
 December 2 – Chris Ridgeway
 December 12 - El Hijo del Vikingo
 December 28 – Saki

Retirements

 Hulk Hogan (1977–January 27, 2012)
 Christina Crawford (July 8, 2010 – 2012)
 Chuck Palumbo (1998-2012) 
 Doug Somers (1971 – February 23, 2012)
 Ron Simmons (1986-March 17, 2012)
 Sage Beckett (2007 - June 24, 2012) (return wrestling in 2014 and retired in 2018)
 Sylvester Terkay (2000 - March 31, 2012)
 Dominic DeNucci (1958-April 14, 2012)
 Kenny Jay (1958-June 16, 2012)
 Tiger Jeet Singh (1965-July 1, 2012) 
 Road Warrior Animal (1982-July 17, 2012) 
 Tyler Reks (February 2007 – August 22, 2012)
 Jerry Lawler (1970-September 10, 2012, had a heart attack and returned to wrestling in 2013) 
 Sara Del Rey (2001 – September 2012) (moved to a trainer)
 Vladimir Kozlov (April 7, 2006 – October 16, 2012)
 Richie Steamboat (July 25, 2008 – October 25, 2012)
 Beth Phoenix (May 2001 – October 29, 2012) (Commentator in NXT, occasional wrestler)
 Ric Flair (December 10, 1972 – December 3, 2012) (full retirement, return for one in 2022 for Ric Flair's Last Match)
 Kelly Kelly (June 13, 2006 – December 4, 2012) (brief return in 2018 - Royal Rumble and WWE Evolution, 2020 event)
 Dave Finlay (1974 – December 22, 2012)

Deaths 
 January 12- MS-1 (wrestler), 55
 January 12 - Savannah Jack, 63
 February 26 - Don Joyce (American football), 82
 February 29 - Woody Farmer, 76
 March 2 – Doug Furnas, 52
 March 13 - Joe McCarthy, 82 
 March 22 - Joe Blanchard, 83 
 April 3 – Chief Jay Strongbow, 83
 April 14 - Dom Travis, 31
 May 26 – Hans Schmidt, 87
 June 23 - Adorable Rubí, 68
 July 12 - Dara Singh, 83 
 July 16 - Bob Babbitt, 74
 July 20 - Goldie Rogers, 61 
 August 12 -  Red Bastien, 81
 August 17 - Joey Kovar, 29
 September 30 – Bobby Jaggers, 64 
 October 10 - Alex Karras, 77
 October 18 – Brain Damage, 34
 c. October 19 – Mike Graham, 61
 November 1 – Brad Armstrong, 50
 November 15 - Awesome Kong, 54 
 November 29 – Buddy Roberts, 65
 December 9 - Mike Boyette, 69 
 December 22 - Rip Hawk, 82 
 December 28 – Emilio Charles Jr., 56

See also
List of NJPW pay-per-view events
List of ROH pay-per-view events
List of TNA pay-per-view events
List of WWE pay-per-view events

References

 
professional wrestling